René Møller (15 February 1946 – 23 August 1994) was a Danish former footballer, who played as a forward for Randers Freja and Heart of Midlothian.

References

1946 births
1994 deaths
People from Randers
Association football forwards
Danish men's footballers
Randers FC players
Heart of Midlothian F.C. players
Scottish Football League players
Danish expatriate men's footballers
Expatriate footballers in Scotland
Danish expatriate sportspeople in Scotland
Sportspeople from the Central Denmark Region